Landslides is a monthly peer-reviewed scientific journal covering research on all aspects of landslides. The topics covered by the journal range from landslide identification and monitoring, remote sensing, laboratory and field testing, to risk assessment and mitigation. It was established in 2004 as the official journal of the International Consortium on Landslides and is published by Springer Science+Business Media. The editor-in-chief is Kyoji Sassa (Kyoto University).

Abstracting and indexing
Landslides is abstracted and indexed in:

According to the 2018 Journal Citation Reports, the journal has a 2017 impact factor of 3.811.

References

External links

Geomorphology journals
Earth and atmospheric sciences journals
Publications established in 2004
Monthly journals
Springer Science+Business Media academic journals
Geophysics journals
English-language journals